The Adventures of Tom Sawyer was a seven-part series produced by the BBC. After it was broadcast in England, it was brought to the U.S. as part of the What's New? series on National Educational Television. Fred Smith, who played Tom Sawyer, and Mike Strotheide, who played Huckleberry Finn, were the sons of American servicemen stationed in Britain; the rest of the cast was primarily British. The teleplay was adapted from Mark Twain's The Adventures of Tom Sawyer by C.E. Webber and incorporated folk songs from Peggy Seegar. The series of 30-minute episodes originally debuted on the BBC on July 24, 1960  and concluded on September 4, 1960.

Episodes

References

Television shows based on American novels
BBC television miniseries
Works based on The Adventures of Tom Sawyer
Television shows based on works by Mark Twain